Airside was a design studio founded in 1998 by Alex Maclean, Nat Hunter and Fred Deakin. The company won many awards, including recognition from D&AD, BAFTA and Design Week.

Co-founder Deakin is one half of ambient/electronica music duo Lemon Jelly. Promotional material for Lemon Jelly, including posters, album covers and videos was produced by Airside.

History
Founded before the dot-com bubble, Airside was initially known as a graphic design company; it later diversified into film-making with animation. The company closed in 2012, after being suspended for a year.

References

External links 
 Airside Website (Archived)

Defunct companies based in London
Graphic design studios
Design companies established in 1998
1998 establishments in England
British companies disestablished in 2012
2012 disestablishments in England
British companies established in 1998